Temple House may refer to:

Temple House Manor and Castle, Ballinacarrow on the outskirts of Ballymote in south County Sligo, Ireland
Temple House (Pine Bluff, Arkansas), listed on the US National Register of Historic Places (NRHP)
Temple Mansion, Industry, California, listed on the NRHP in California
The Temple House, an event venue and former residence in South Beach, Miami, Florida
John Roland Temple House, Hartwell, Georgia, listed on the NRHP in Georgia
Temple-Skelton House, Hartwell, Georgia, listed on the NRHP in Georgia
Temple, Marcellus Luther and Julia Protzman, House, Osceola, Iowa, listed on the NRHP in Iowa
Joseph Temple House, Reading, Massachusetts, NRHP-listed
Mark Temple House, Reading, Massachusetts, NRHP-listed
Samuel W. Temple House, Tecumseh, Michigan, NRHP-listed
Temple-Webster-Stoner House, Romansville, Pennsylvania, NRHP-listed
Henry G. Temple House, Diboll, Texas, listed on the NRHP in Texas
Lands of Templehouse, an estate near Dunlop, East Ayrshire, Scotland

See also
Temple (disambiguation)
House temple (disambiguation)
Temple Hall, Leesburg, Virginia , NRHP-listed